Patricia Kopatchinskaja (born March 1977) is a Moldovan-Austrian-Swiss violinist.

Biography

Early life 
Kopatchinskaja was born in Chișinău, in the Moldavian Soviet Socialist Republic (now Moldova). She comes from a family of musicians. Her parents were both with the state folk ensemble of Moldova: her mother, Emilia Kopatchinskaja, was a violinist, and her father, Viktor Kopatchinsky, was a cimbalom player. While her parents were on concert tour through the former Eastern bloc, she grew up with her grandparents. She started playing the violin at age 6.

In 1989, the family fled to Vienna. Kopatchinskaja entered the University of Music and Performing Arts, Vienna at age 17, where she studied musical composition and violin. From age 21 to 23, she finished her studies in Bern, at the Musikhochschule, where her teachers included Igor Ozim. Kopatchinskaja, her Swiss neurologist husband, and their daughter live in Bern, Switzerland.

Career 
In 2016, Kopatchinskaja wrote an editorial for The Guardian outlining her approach to music and her career and her preference for playing music "from the borders" of the repertoire instead of the standard repertoire of "Bach, Beethoven, Brahms, Bruckner, and Bruch." She later said, "Standard pieces should be used only as exceptional, rare elements in programmes. There are enough recordings out there already.… The classical music industry is so far behind. If someone does anything that’s even just a tiny bit different, it becomes a huge, heated discussion."

In 2014, the British Royal Philharmonic Society  gave Kopatchinskaja one of its annual Music Awards in the instrumentalist category, calling her an "irresistible force of nature: passionate, challenging and totally original in her approach".

Soloist 
Kopatchinskaja has played with most of the important European orchestras including Vienna, Berlin and London Philharmonic. She regularly plays in Japan and Australia and recently also extended her activity to the United States, South America, Russia and China. She has ongoing collaborations with conductors including Teodor Currentzis, Péter Eötvös, Iván Fischer, Heinz Holliger, Vladimir Jurowski, Andrés Orozco-Estrada, Kirill Petrenko, Sir Simon Rattle and François-Xavier Roth.

Leading orchestras and festivals 
Kopatchinskaja's experience as a leader of ensembles and chamber orchestras includes a tour with Britten Sinfonia, repeated tours with Mahler Chamber Orchestra and Australian Chamber Orchestra and being an artistic partner of the Saint Paul Chamber Orchestra since 2014. Presently she is an artistic partner of the Camerata Bern. She has organised several staged concert productions, including "Death and the Maiden" with the Saint Paul Chamber Orchestra, "Bye-Bye Beethoven" with the Mahler Chamber Orchestra, "Dies Irae" with Lucerne Festival Alumni, and "War and Chips" and "Time and Eternity" with Camerata Bern.

From 2003 to 2005 Kopatchinskaja organised the Rüttihubeliade festival in the Swiss Alps. In June 2018, she was the music director of the Ojai Music Festival in California.

Chamber music partners 
Regular chamber music partners include cellist Sol Gabetta, clarinettist Reto Bieri and the pianists Joonas Ahonen, Markus Hinterhäuser, Polina Leschenko and Anthony Romaniuk. In April 2016, Kopatchinskaja performed with Anoushka Shankar at a concert in Konzerthaus Berlin, Germany. The Raga Piloo was composed, performed and recorded by Ravi Shankar as a duet with Yehudi Menuhin on the album West Meets East, Volume 2 in 1968.

Historically informed performance 
Kopatchinskaja has collaborated with Il Giardino Armonico, the Akademie für Alte Musik Berlin, MusicAeterna Perm, the Orchestre des Champs-Élysées, the Orchestra of the Age of Enlightenment under the direction of Giovanni Antonini, René Jacobs and Philippe Herreweghe. She also has performed with Sir Roger Norrington and Roy Goodman.

New music and works 
Kopatchinskaja has been outspoken in her support of new works and living composers, as well as works not considered part of the standard violin repertoire. She has performed and recorded works by Luca Francesconi, Francisco Coll García, Mark-Anthony Turnage, Sanchez-Chiong, Stefano Gervasoni, Simone Movio, Michael Hersch, Esa Pekka Salonen, Péter Eötvös, Heinz Holliger, and Michel van der Aa. Her "Time and Eternity" program with Camerata Bern, recorded for Alpha Classics, featured music by John Zorn, Ikonnikow, Tadeusz Sygietynski, Machaut, and Bach, along with Karl Amadeus Hartmann's Concerto Funebre.

Voice 
Kopatchinskaja uses the voice in several compositions, including John Cage's Living Room Music, Jorge Sanchez-Chiong's Crin, Michael Hersch's Duo for violin and cello Das Rückgrat berstend, Heinz Holliger's Das kleine Irgendwas, her own cadenza for György Ligeti's Violin Concerto, and Otto Zykan's Das mit der Stimme.

In 2017, Kopatchinskaja performed the voice part (Sprechgesang) in Arnold Schönberg's Pierrot lunaire in the USA and since 2018 has performed the piece many times with, among others, members of the Berlin Philharmonic, the Montreal and Göteborg Symphonies, and her own ensemble.

In 2018–19, Kopatchinskaja and some friends made a film based on Kurt Schwitters's Dadaistic nonsense poem "Ursonate" (1932). It has been shown at several festivals.

Violin 
Kopatchinskaja plays a violin by Giovanni Francesco Pressenda (Turin) in 1834, which The Strad's Dennis Rooney called "a very colourful-sounding instrument whose viola-like quality lent her playing exceptional tonal interest". In 2010, she briefly played the 1741 "ex-Carrodus" violin by Guarneri del Gesù, on loan from the Austrian National Bank but had to give it back because of unresolvable problems with Swiss customs authorities. In period-instrument environments, she uses a violin by Ferdinando Gagliano (Naples, ca. 1780, mounted with a lowered bridge and gut strings) and appropriate bows.

First performances 

Kopatchinskaja has given first performances of numerous works, e.g.:
 2004/5 seven first performances, among them violin concertos dedicated to her by Johanna Doderer and Otto Zykan
 2005/6 first performances of violin concertos dedicated to her by Gerald Resch and Gerd Kühr with the Vienna Radio Symphony Orchestra
 2007/8 first performances of violin concertos dedicated to her by Jürg Wyttenbach and the Turkish composer/pianist Fazıl Say
 2009 first performance of the violin concerto dedicated to her by Faradj Karajew
 2011 first performance of violin concertos dedicated to her by Maurizio Sotelo and Helmut Oehring ("Four seasons") as well as the work "Oh whispering suns" for double choir, solo violin and cymbal by Vanessa Lann
 2012 first performance of the Romance for violin and strings dedicated to her by Tigran Mansurian with Amsterdam Sinfonietta.
 2014 first performance of her own violin concerto "Hortus animae" with Camerata Bern.
 2015 (August) first performance of «Dialogue», concerto for Violin, Cello and Orchestra by Mark-Anthony Turnage (with Sol Gabetta and Gstaad Festival Orchestra).
 2015 (November) first performance of the violin concerto written for her by the American composer Michael Hersch with the Saint Paul Chamber Orchestra.
 2016 first performance of Mauricio Sotelo's "Red Inner Light Sculpture" for Solo Violin, Strings, percussion and Flamenco Dancer (commissioned by P.K.)
 2017 first performance of Michael Hersch's duet for violin and cello "Das Rückgrat berstend", with Jay Campbell. 
 2019 first performance of Michel van der Aa's Double concerto for violin and violoncello with Sol Gabetta, Concertgebouw Orchestra and Peter Eötvös.
 2019 first performance of Francisco Coll's double concerto für violin and violoncello with Sol Gabetta und Camerata Bern, composer directing.
 2019 first performance of Francisco Coll's LaLuLa-Lied.
 2019 first performance of the duo for violin and cello by Marton Illes with Jay Campbell in Santa Barbara, California. 
 2020 first performance of the violin concerto by Marton Illes with WDR-Orchestra Cologne, directed by Michael Wendeberg
 2020 first performance of the violin concerto by Francisco Coll with Luxembourg Philharmonic directed by Gustavo Gimeno.
 2020 first performance of the violin concerto "Possible Places" by Dmitri Kourliandski (b.1976) with SWR-orchestra Stuttgart and Teodor Currentzis.
 2020 First performance of the double concerto for two violins "Gemini" by Helene Winkelmann, with Helene Winkelmann, Basel Symphony Orchestra and Ivor Bolton.
 2021 First performance of the violin concerto "Corpo elettrico" by Luca Francesconi in Porto with Orquestra Sinfónica Casa da Música and Stephan Blunier (followed by the French premiere in Paris).
 2021 First performance of the concerto for violin, orchestra and electronics by Fred Popovici with Moldova Philharmonic Orchestra Iasi (Romania) and Adrian Petrescu in Iasi und Bucarest 

Richard Carrick, Violeta Dinescu, Michalis Economou, Heinz Holliger, Ludwig Nussbichler, Jorge Sánchez-Chiong, Ivan Sokolov, and Boris Yoffe have also written works for her.

Awards 
 2000: 1st prize in the International Henryk Szeryng Competition in Mexico
 2002: Credit Suisse Young Artist Award
 2004: New Talent – SPP Award of the European Broadcasting Union (EBU)
 2006: Deutschlandfunk-award of the Bremer Musikfest
 2008: Award of the music commission Kanton Bern, Switzerland
 2009: ECHO in the category chamber music for the CD recorded with Fazıl Say (works by Beethoven, Ravel, Bártok & Say)
 2010: BBC-Music-Magazine award (orchestral category) for the CD recorded with Philippe Herreweghe and the Orchestre des Champs Elysees: Collected works for violin and orchestra by Beethoven
 2011: "Golden Bow"-award of the Meiringen music festival, Switzerland
 2012: Praetorius music award of the county Niedersachsen, Germany in the category "musical innovation"
 2013: ECHO in the category concert recording of the year (20th/21st century/violin) for the double-CD with violin concertos by Bartók, Ligeti and Eötvös, recorded with the hr-Sinfonieorchester Frankfurt respectively Ensemble Modern under Peter Eötvös (Naive)
 2013: Gramophone Award "Recording of the year" and Grammy-nomination, both for the double-CD with violin concertos by Bartók, Ligeti and Eötvös, recorded with the hr-Sinfonieorchester Frankfurt respectively Ensemble Modern under Peter Eötvös (Naive)
 2014: International Classical Music Awards (Category Concerto) for the double CD with violin concertos by Bartók, Ligeti and Eötvös
 2014: Prix Caecilia (Belgium) for the CD with violin concertos by Stravinsky and Prokofjev recorded with London Philharmonic Orchestra and Vladimir Jurowski (Naive)
 2014: Royal Philharmonic Society Music Awards 2013 (Category instrumentalist)
 2016: Music Award of the Canton of Bern, Switzerland for "remarkable musical achievements"
 2017: Grand Prix of the Swiss Music Awards
 2018: Grammy in the ‘Best Chamber Music/Small Ensemble Performance’ category for her Death & The Maiden album with the Saint Paul Chamber Orchestra on Alpha Classics
 2019: 29. Würth Prize of Jeunesses Musicales Germany
 2020: Honorary Membership Konzerthausgesellschaft Vienna
 2021: OPUS KLASSIK-Award and Edison-Award for What's Next Vivaldi? (CD Alpha Classics) with  Giardino Armonico directed by Giovanni Antonini 
 2022: BBC Music Magazine award, category concerto for CD "Plaisirs illuminés" (Alpha Classics) with Camerata Bern, Sol Gabetta and Francisco Coll.

Discography

References

External links

 
 

1977 births
21st-century classical violinists
Austrian classical violinists
Living people
Moldovan classical violinists
Musicians from Chișinău
Women classical violinists
20th-century classical violinists
20th-century women musicians
21st-century women musicians
People from Bern
Austrian people of Moldovan descent
Swiss people of Moldovan descent
Naïve Records artists